William Turner Coggeshall (1824–1867) was a publisher, librarian, and ambassador. He was a self-appointed bodyguard for Abraham Lincoln.

Early life
William T. Coggeshall was born in Lewistown, Pennsylvania on September 6, 1824. He settled in Akron, Ohio in 1842, and published the temperance newspaper Cascade Roarer there from 1844 to 1845. He married Mary Maria Carpenter on October 26, 1845.

Publisher
In 1847, Coggeshall moved to Cincinnati, Ohio, where he wrote for and later edited the Western Fountain, and may also have written for the Gazette and Times. He travelled with General Louis Kossuth during 1851–1852, reporting on his tour and speeches for newspapers. In 1852 he became assistant editor of the Daily Columbian, a news and business paper.

From 1854 to 1856, Coggeshall was publisher and editor of The Genius of the West, a literary magazine in Cincinnati. In 1856, he was in need of cash, and sold the magazine after securing appointment as State Librarian of Ohio by Governor Chase. He was re-appointed as Librarian and private secretary by Governor Dennison in 1860, and held those positions until 1862.

In 1860, Coggeshall published The Poets and Poetry of the West: With Biographical and Critical Notices. In the book, he compiled contemporaneous poetry and authors, including writer Rosella Rice, best known for her vivid descriptions of Johnny Appleseed.

Lincoln's bodyguard
On February 13, 1861, President elect Abraham Lincoln passed through the state capitol on his trip to Washington, D.C. for his inauguration. As the governor's representative, Coggeshall met Lincoln at the station, and escorted him to the statehouse. Coggeshall accompanied Lincoln to Washington as reporter for the Ohio State Journal and bodyguard. He acted as bodyguard off and on for Lincoln, and was on the dais for the Gettysburg Address. Coggeshall had a private meeting with Lincoln on Good Friday, 1865, before embarking by rail for Ohio. After Lincoln's assassination later that day, Coggeshall returned to Washington, and accompanied Lincoln's funeral train to Springfield, Illinois. For benefit of the Ohio Soldier's Monument Fund, he wrote Lincoln memorial: the journeys of Abraham Lincoln from Springfield to Washington, 1861, as president elect, and from Washington to Springfield, as president martyred; comprising an account of public ceremonies on the entire route, and full details of both journeys. (1865)

Publisher and diplomat
Coggeshall bought the Springfield Republic in 1862 and sold it in 1865, when he became editor of the Ohio State Journal. By that time, his health was failing due to tuberculosis he had contracted early in the war while acting as a secret agent for the Union. He desired a less stressful employment and healthier environment, and lobbied his political friends for appointment as United States Ambassador to Ecuador, where he hoped the mountain air would be healthier. He was formally appointed by President Andrew Johnson in May, 1866. Coggeshall arrived in Quito on August 2, 1866, with his fifteen-year-old daughter Jesse. His health did not improve, and he died one year later. His daughter was detained by red tape, and acted as ambassador for four months, dying at Quayaquill of Yellow Fever, January 10, 1868. In 1869, Congress appropriated moneys to bring both bodies back to Columbus, where they were buried at Green Lawn Cemetery in 1870.

Publications

Notes

References

1824 births
1867 deaths
Burials at Green Lawn Cemetery (Columbus, Ohio)
Ambassadors of the United States to Ecuador
Writers from Columbus, Ohio
American librarians
19th-century American newspaper publishers (people)
19th-century American journalists
American male journalists
19th-century American male writers
Journalists from Ohio